Kacerov may refer to places in the Czech Republic:

Kačerov, a Prague Metro station
Kaceřov (Sokolov District), a municipality and village in the Karlovy Vary Region
Kaceřov (Plzeň-North District), a municipality and village in the Plzeň Region
Kačerov, a village and part of Loket (Benešov District) in the Central Bohemian Region